Yussuf Abdullah Harun is an Awami League politician and the incumbent member of parliament for Comilla-3.

Early life
Harun was born on 15 November 1947 to a Bengali Muslim family in the village of Bhubanghar in Muradnagar, Tippera District. His father, Harun-or-Rashid, was also the MP of Comilla-3 but as a member of the Bangladesh Nationalist Party, and his mother's name is Noor Jahan Rashid. Harun completed a bachelor in communication. He is an F.C.A. fellow of the Institute of Chartered Accountants of Bangladesh.

Career
Harun was a councilor of Dhaka Stock Exchange and president of the Federation of Bangladesh Chambers of Commerce and Industry in 1998.

Harun was the President of Federation of Bangladesh Chambers of Commerce and Industry in 2003. He is the chairman of Asia Insurance Limited.

On 20 April 2004, Harun received bail in a murder case. He had been accused of shooting a Bangladesh Nationalist Party activist during a clash with Awami League on 5 May 2002.

Harun was re-elected chairman of Asia Insurance Limited in 2011.

Harun was elected to parliament in 2014 as an independent candidate. He received 78,647 votes while his nearest rival, independent candidate Ahsanul Alam Kishor, received 56,336 votes. He is a member of the committee on estimates of the 10th Jatiya Sangsad.  He took the initiative to help design and open the Allah Chattar in Muradnagar.

Harun was re-elected to parliament from Comilla-3 in 2018 as an Awami League candidate. He received 273,182 votes while his nearest rival, KM Mujibul Haque of Bangladesh Nationalist Party, received 12,358 votes.

References

Living people
10th Jatiya Sangsad members
11th Jatiya Sangsad members
1947 births
Independent politicians in Bangladesh
20th-century Bengalis
21st-century Bengalis
21st-century Muslims
Comilla Victoria Government College alumni